Grand Theft Auto: The Ballad of Gay Tony is the second of two episodic expansion packs available for the 2008 video game Grand Theft Auto IV, developed by Rockstar North and published by Rockstar Games. The game was released individually for the Xbox 360 on 29 October 2009, and for the PlayStation 3 and Microsoft Windows on 13 April 2010, as part of a standalone disc-based package titled Grand Theft Auto: Episodes from Liberty City, which also contains Grand Theft Auto: The Lost and Damned and does not require the base game to be played. Microsoft added Episodes from Liberty City to its backwards compatibility list for Xbox One platforms in February 2017.

Set concurrently with the events of Grand Theft Auto IV and The Lost and Damned, The Ballad of Gay Tony follows Luis Fernando Lopez, a Dominican-American former drug dealer-turned-bodyguard and best friend of Anthony "Gay Tony" Prince, a nightclub magnate and high-status socialite in Liberty City. The main storyline of the episode focuses on Luis' efforts to help Tony overcome various problems, including drugs, debts, disputes with Mafia crime families, and attempts on both of their lives. It also ties up loose ends from Grand Theft Auto IV and The Lost and Damned regarding the diamond sale storyline that connects all three games.

The game received largely positive reviews from critics and is retrospectively considered to be among the best downloadable content packs of all time.

Gameplay 
Grand Theft Auto: The Ballad of Gay Tony is an action-adventure game set in the open world environment of Liberty City. It features similar gameplay, and the same setting as Grand Theft Auto IV. The player can redo missions to improve their score. The player also has new activities, side jobs, vehicles, and weapons. Luis may call on his friends, Armando and Henrique, to use their special abilities: Armando can sell weapons to Luis while Henrique can supply him a vehicle. Luis can also take them on friend activities. A notable addition, previously introduced in Grand Theft Auto: Chinatown Wars, is a scoring system for missions. The score has no effect, but gauges the player's overall performance in a mission, as well as unique goals they accomplished.

The Ballad of Gay Tony features "side jobs" for players to earn more money. These include Drug Wars, Triathlon Races, managing Prince's nightclubs, entering an Underground Fight Tournament, and BASE jumping. Drug Wars perform similarly to Gang Wars in The Lost and Damned; the player must acquire a drug stash and take it to a drop-off point, with many variations, while being pursued by rival gangs. Triathlon Races consist of skydiving to a collection of boats, sailing through checkpoints, landing at a collection of cars, and street racing to the finish line. Club Management focuses on Luis working as a bouncer for Prince's clubs, handling situations with clubgoers or assisting/chauffeuring VIPs.

Other new activities include golfing at a driving range, a dancing minigame at clubs, drinking games, and air hockey. New weapons, vehicles, and a parachute are also added in this expansion. Other minor changes include a modified display and HUD, such as an altimeter when the player is in the air. The game's multiplayer added new activities.

Synopsis

Setting 

The Ballad of Gay Tony takes place within the same setting used for Grand Theft Auto IV: the fictional U.S. metropolis of Liberty City (based on New York City) and the neighboring state of Alderney (New Jersey). Similarly to The Lost and Damned, the entire map is unlocked after completing the expansion's first mission, allowing players to freely traverse between Liberty City's main boroughs and Alderney. The main storyline of The Ballad of Gay Tony takes place alongside that of the base game and of the first expansion, and features several returning characters and events. A major part of the expansion's narrative focuses on a side-story about a shipment of stolen diamonds, which was only briefly depicted in Grand Theft Auto IV and The Lost and Damned, but receives a proper conclusion here in The Ballad of Gay Tony.

Plot 
In 2008, after witnessing the robbery of the Bank of Liberty, Luis Fernando Lopez (Mario D'Leon) meets with his boss and business partner, nightclub owner "Gay" Tony Prince (David Kenner). Struggling to run the clubs Maisonette 9 and Hercules, Tony takes out loans from the Ancelotti crime family and Mori Kibbutz (Jeff Gurner) to keep them running, ending up in severe debt. Luis finds himself working with both Mori and Rocco Pelosi (Greg Siff), an Ancelotti mobster, to pay off Tony's debts. At the same time, he helps his drug-dealing friends – Armando Torres (Jaime Fernandez) and Henrique Bardas (J Salome Martinez Jr.) – out of several botched deals, and assists Yusuf Amir (Omid Djalili), an Emirati real estate developer interested in buying Tony's clubs, with stealing an attack helicopter and using it to murder multiple arms dealers, stealing an armoured personal carrier, and stealing a subway train. Luis soon becomes annoyed with Tony's failure to stay in control of his clubs and the constant problems he brings from his debts, but eventually settles matters with Mori.

Later, Tony makes plans to buy $2 million worth of smuggled diamonds to sell them at a higher price. However, the deal is ambushed by members of The Lost biker gang, led by Johnny Klebitz (Scott Hill), resulting in the death of Tony's boyfriend Evan Moss (Robert Youells) and the loss of the diamonds. Tony soon locates the stolen diamonds, and has Luis ambush the exchange between Johnny, Niko Bellic (Michael Hollick), and the Jewish mob to take back the diamonds. During this time, Luis also takes on jobs for Russian crime lord Ray Bulgarin (Vitali Baganov), who offers to help cover Tony's debts, but turns on them when he reveals the diamonds were originally his property. Don Giovanni Ancelotti soon orders Luis and Tony to give the diamonds as a ransom payment for his daughter Gracie (Rebecca Benhayon), who was kidnapped by Niko. The diamonds are ultimately lost when Bulgarin intercepts the exchange, though Luis and Tony manage to save Gracie and return her to her father.

Rocco later meets with Luis and advises him to kill Tony to gain favour with Bulgarin, so that he will spare him. Though he contemplates doing so, Luis ultimately refuses and fends off Bulgarin's men when they attack Maisonette 9. Deciding to retaliate, Luis tells Tony to hide while he disrupts Bulgarin's drug operations. Learning that Bulgarin is preparing to leave the city, Luis pursues him with Yusuf's help and kills him aboard his private plane. Bulgarin drops a grenade in the process, destroying the plane, but Luis is able to parachute to safety. Reuniting with Tony, the pair decide to reopen the clubs, declining Yusuf's proposal to sell them to him in the process, as they prefer to keep the clubs a "family business" for the moment.

Elsewhere, the diamonds are found in the trash by a homeless Vietnam War veteran, who sells them and departs for Vice City.

Reception 

Grand Theft Auto: The Ballad of Gay Tony received "generally favorable" reviews from critics, according to review aggregator Metacritic. At the 2009 Spike Video Game Awards, The Ballad of Gay Tony was awarded the Best DLC award.

Complex ranked Anthony "Gay Tony" Prince as the coolest LGBT video game character in a 2013 list, referring to him as "the hot mess of the GTA series".

Notes

References

External links 

2009 video games
Action-adventure games
Cultural depictions of the Mafia
Episodic video games
Euphoria (software) games
Games for Windows certified games
Grand Theft Auto IV
LGBT-related video games
Multiplayer and single-player video games
Open-world video games
Organized crime video games
PlayStation 3 games
Rockstar Games games
Take-Two Interactive games
Video game downloadable content
Video game expansion packs
Video games about the illegal drug trade
Video games developed in the United Kingdom
Video games produced by Leslie Benzies
Video games set in 2008
Video games set in the United States
Video games written by Dan Houser
Windows games
Works about the Russian Mafia
Xbox 360 games